Adult Alternative Airplay, also known as Triple A, is a record chart that ranks the most-played songs on American adult album alternative radio stations. Formulated based on each song's weekly total plays, the chart was introduced in the January 20, 1996 issue of Radio & Records magazine. Adult Alternative Songs, along with other Radio & Records airplay charts, was initially compiled using radio airplay data from Mediabase. In August 2006, Radio & Records was acquired by The Nielsen Company – then known as VNU Media – parent company of rival publication Billboard. Following the purchase, Nielsen Broadcast Data Systems replaced Mediabase in monitoring airplay for charts, beginning with the issue dated August 11, 2006. Billboard themselves introduced the chart in their July 5, 2008 issue, appropriating the same Nielsen data, and became its sole publisher after Radio & Records ceased publication in June 2009.

The Billboard website currently lists Adult Alternative Songs charts dating back to January 1996. These charts are based on data from a Triple A chart that had previously been published in the Billboard-owned Airplay Monitor magazine from that date until the acquisition of Radio & Records, and which had used Nielsen data that was largely similar to the Mediabase data used in the Radio & Records chart.

On the Billboard Adult Alternative Songs decade-end chart, "Use Somebody" by American rock band Kings of Leon, which originally topped the chart for two weeks in 2009, ranked as the overall top single of the 2000s. The decade-end top artist was English alternative rock band Coldplay, who scored eight number-one adult alternative singles during the 2000s.

Number-one singles
Key
 – Billboard year-end number-one single
 – Billboard decade-end number-one single
↑ – Return of a single to number one

References

External links
 Adult Alternative Songs at Billboard

2000s
United States adult alternative singles